Rilwan Salawu (born 3 December 1987) is a Nigerian-born American soccer player who plays for Atlanta SC in the National Independent Soccer Association. He plays primarily as a defensive midfielder, but has played as a striker or holding midfielder in the past.

Early life
He was born in Lagos, Nigeria where he was a member of the Pepsi Academy. He moved to Brooklyn at a young age and soon developed an interest in basketball and played varsity basketball at Franklin Delano Roosevelt High School, but he opted to play soccer at the college level.

Club career
He played soccer briefly for SUNY Cobleskill in upstate New York and then transferred to SUNY Binghamton in 2008. He was officially invited to join the Nigerian U-20 side, while on a trip to Nigeria in the summer of 2008. The team was then coached by Ladan Bosso and they were preparing for the 2009 U-20 African Qualification Tournament in Sudan. His late birthday was days before the cut-off and this prevented him from making the final selection of the Nigeria U-20 team, however this opportunity kick-started his professional football career.

He went on to play for Maxbees FC, a second division team in Ghana, and several Premier Development League (PDL) teams in the United States, most notably the Brooklyn Knights, the Westchester Flames and the FC JAX Destroyers. He then moved to Europe and played for Kjellerup IF in the Danish 2nd Division, where he featured in the DBU Cup, and in Turkey for Kurtalanspor and Bulancakspor.

He joined the Belmopan Bandits in Belize in 2017, and featured in their inaugural CONCACAF League appearance. In 2018, he continued with the Belmopan Bandits and won the Belize Premier League and a second qualification for the CONCACAF League. He won the 2018–19 Belize Premier League again and also featured in the 2018 CONCACAF League.

References

External links

1987 births
Nigerian footballers
Living people
American soccer players
Association football midfielders
Belmopan Bandits players
Westchester Flames players
FC JAX Destroyers players
Kjellerup IF players
Atlanta Silverbacks players
Premier League of Belize players
USL League Two players
Nigerian emigrants to the United States
American sportspeople of Nigerian descent
Sportspeople from Lagos
Sportspeople from Brooklyn
Soccer players from New York City